Mesoscia anguilinea is a moth of the family Megalopygidae. It was described by William Schaus in 1912.

References

Moths described in 1912
Megalopygidae